Teeyapar Sretsirisuvarna, nickname Petch (born 30 July 1992 in Bangkok) is a Thai DJ and beauty pageant titleholder who was crowned Miss Earth Thailand 2019. She represented Thailand at the Miss Earth 2019 and Miss Earth 2020 pageant and finally she was placed in Top 20.

Early life
Teeyapar Sretsirisuvarna (old name:Jirapha Kritshnasuvarna, Sakolsupha Kritshnasuvarna, E-mikant Rachatachirachot and Sunannipar Kritshnasuvarna) was born in Bangkok, Thailand. She graduated from Business Administration of the North Bangkok University. Now she studying MBA for IT-Smart at Ramkhamhaeng University.

Pageantry

Miss Universe Thailand 2014
Sretsirisuvarna competed in Miss Universe Thailand 2014 and placed at 2nd runner up, but later she was dethroned because of her scandal.

Miss Earth Thailand 2019
Sretsirisuvarna was appointed as Miss Earth Thailand 2019 by National Director of Miss Earth Thailand.

Miss Earth 2019
Sretsirisuvarna was represent Thailand at Miss Earth 2019 pageant in Parañaque, Philippines on 26 October 2019 where she placed in the Top 20 and won Best Eco-Social Media Award. During Miss Earth 2019, She was part of the FIRE group together with more than 29 other candidates.

Miss Earth 2020
Sretsirisuvarna was represent Thailand in the international Miss Earth 2020 pageant on 29 November 2020  where she placed in the Top 20 and competed with 83 other delegates from various countries which was held virtually due to restrictions caused by the covid-19 pandemic.

References

External links

1992 births
Living people
Teeyapar Sretsirisuvarna
Teeyapar Sretsirisuvarna
Miss Earth 2019 contestants
Miss Earth 2020 contestants
Miss Earth Thailand